This list includes alumni and faculty of George Mason University.

Notable faculty

Nobel laureates

 James M. Buchanan, Nobel Prize-winning economist (1986)
 Vernon L. Smith, Nobel Prize-winning economist (2002)

Pulitzer Prize winners
 Steven Pearlstein, Pulitzer Prize winner for Commentary in 2008
 Martin Sherwin, Pulitzer Prize winner for his biography of Robert Oppenheimer
 Roger Wilkins, Pulitzer Prize winner for coverage of the Watergate scandal (along with Bob Woodward and Carl Bernstein) while he was working at The Washington Post; retired

College of Humanities and Social Sciences

 William Sims Bainbridge
 Shaul Bakhash, scholar of Persian studies; husband of Haleh Esfandiari
 Mary Catherine Bateson, former Clarence J. Robinson Professor in Anthropology and English; Professor Emerita
 Robert Bausch, novelist
 Rei Berroa, poet
 Andrés Boiarsky
 Courtney Angela Brkic, poet
 Michael Bunn
 Alan Cheuse, novelist
 Arthur W. Chickering
 Wilfrid Desan
 Bùi Diễm, South Vietnam's Ambassador to the United States
 Robert J. Elder, Jr, Air Force Commander
 Marita Golden, novelist
 Gerald L. Gordon
 Joshua Greenberg
 Hugh Gusterson
 Helon Habila
 Deanna Hammond
 Frances V. Harbour
 Hugh Heclo, professor of American politics and winner of John Gaus award
 Carma Hinton, documentary filmmaker, The Gate of Heavenly Peace
 Susan Hirsch, legal and linguistic anthropologist
 Mark N. Katz
 Peter Klappert, poet
 Gary L Kreps
 Thelma Z. Lavine, philosopher
 Suzannah Lessard, writer
 Lawrence W. Levine, historian
 Samuel Robert Lichter, former professor at Princeton University, Georgetown University, George Washington University, Yale, and Columbia University
 Peter Mandaville, professor of international affairs and scholar of political Islam
 Nadine Meyer, poet
 Robert Nadeau, English professor
 Eric Pankey, poet
 Roy Rosenzweig
 Richard E. Rubenstein
 Clare Shore
 Susan Shreve
 Richard Norton Smith, presidential historian; former director of five presidential libraries
 Rod Smith, poet
 Peter Stearns, American historian and former provost
 Lev Vekker, psychologist 
 Rex A. Wade, professor of Russian history
 Margaret R. Yocom
 Mary Kay Zuravleff, novelist
 Jeremy Crampton, cartographer

Department of Economics

 Peter Boettke
 Donald J. Boudreaux
 Henry N. Butler
 Bryan Caplan
 Tyler Cowen
 Christopher Coyne
 Richard H. Fink, Executive Vice President of the Koch Industries
 Joseph L. Fisher, U.S. Congressman from Virginia
 Jack A. Goldstone
 Wendy Lee Gramm
 Robin Hanson
 Laurence Iannaccone
 Manuel H. Johnson, former Vice Governor of the Federal Reserve
 Daniel B. Klein
 Arnold Kling
 Don Lavoie
 Peter T. Leeson
 Kevin McCabe
 Maurice McTigue, former Minister for Labor in New Zealand
 James C. Miller III, Director of the Office of Management and Budget under President Ronald Reagan
 Jennifer Roback Morse
 Russ Roberts, host of EconTalk
 George Selgin
 Alex Tabarrok
 Robert Tollison
 Gordon Tullock, developed the public choice theory
 Richard E. Wagner
 Lawrence H. White
 Walter E. Williams, John M. Olin Distinguished Professor of Economics
 Bart Wilson
 Bruce Yandle, Executive Director of the Federal Trade Commission

School of Art 

 Chawky Frenn

School for Conflict Analysis and Resolution
 Kevin Avruch, Henry Hart Rice Professor of Conflict Resolution and Professor of Anthropology and Dean of S-CAR
 Marc Gopin, James H. Laue Professor of World Religions, Diplomacy and Conflict Resolution
 Susan Hirsch, Professor of Conflict Resolution and Anthropology
 Richard E. Rubenstein, University Professor of Conflict Resolution and Public Affairs

Schar School of Policy and Government

 Zoltan Acs
 David S. Alberts, Director of Research for the Office of the Assistant Secretary of Defense.
 Kenneth Button
 Thomas M. Davis, former U.S. Congressman from Virginia.
 Robert Deitz, former Chief Counsel of the Central Intelligence Agency and National Security Agency.
 Desmond Dinan
 Richard Florida
 William Conrad Gibbons
 Marc Gopin
 Stephen Haseler
 Michael Hayden, former Director of the Central Intelligence Agency and National Security Agency.
Ellen Laipson, former CEO of The Stimson Center.
 Seymour Martin Lipset
Andrew McCabe, former acting Director of the Federal Bureau of Investigation.
 Patrick Mendis, American diplomat and expert on Sino-American relations.
 Patrick Michaels, climatologist.
 Thomas J. Miller, former United States Ambassador to Greece, and Bosnia and Herzegovina.
Michael Morell, former acting Director of the Central Intelligence Agency.
Saskia Popescu, infectious disease epidemiologist
 Bill Schneider, Los Angeles Times contributor and former CNN senior political analyst.
 Jeremy Shearmur
 Louise Shelley
 Richard Norton Smith
 John N. Warfield

College of Science
 Yakir Aharonov (Professor from 2006 to 2008), physicist, known for Aharonov–Bohm effect, winner of National Medal of Science (2009)
 David Albright
 Ken Alibek, Colonel in the Soviet Union in charge of biodefense
 Robert Axtell
 Peter J. Denning
 Genevieve Grotjan Feinstein, mathematician and cryptanalyst.
 Klaus Fischer, mathematician.
 Peter A. Freeman
 Robert Hazen, Clarence Robinson Professor of Earth Science; author.
 Abul Hussam, inventor of the Sono arsenic filter, for which he received the 2007 sustainability prize awarded by the National Academy of Engineering.
 Thomas Lovejoy
 Angela Orebaugh
 Suresh V. Shenoy
 Jagdish Shukla, meteorologist
 Fred Singer
 John P. Snyder, cartographer
 James Trefil, physicist, and author
 Ernst Volgenau, chairman and founder of SRA International
 Edward Wegman, statistician
 Boris Willis

School of Systems Biology
 Valery Soyfer

School of Business
 Teresa J. Domzal, dean of the School of Business
 Jim Larranaga, Mason's head men's basketball coach from 1997-2011
 Anthony Sanders, Distinguished Professor of Real Estate Finance
 Raymond W. Smith

Antonin Scalia Law School
 Jonathan H. Adler, legal commentator and law professor
 Peter Berkowitz
 David Bernstein
 Lawrence J. Block, Federal Judge
 Frank H. Buckley
 Henry N. Butler, Republican candidate for member of the U.S. House of Representatives from Virginia's 11th congressional district
 Susan Dudley, Administrator of the Office of Information and Regulatory Affairs under President George W. Bush
 Victoria Espinel, United States Intellectual Property Enforcement Coordinator
 Adrian S. Fisher, lawyer, diplomat, and politician during the 1960s and 1970s
 Sandra Froman, President of the National Rifle Association of America
 Sigrid Fry-Revere, founder and president of Center for Ethical Solutions
 Ernest Gellhorn
 Douglas H. Ginsburg, judge on the United States Court of Appeals for the District of Columbia Circuit; Ronald Reagan's nominee to the United States Supreme Court
 Irving Kayton, founder of the Patent Resources Group, Inc. (PRG)
 William Kovacic, former member of the Federal Trade Commission
 Michael I. Krauss, former Commissioner for Québec's Human Rights Commission
 William H. Lash, former United States Assistant Secretary of Commerce
 James LeMunyon, former United States Assistant Secretary of Commerce
 Robert A. Levy, chairman of the Cato Institute
 Leonard Liggio, Vice President of Atlas Economic Research Foundation
 Deborah Platt Majoras, former chairman of the Federal Trade Commission
 Henry Manne
 James C. Miller III, Chairman of the Federal Trade Commission; Budget Director for President Ronald Reagan
 John Warwick Montgomery
 Timothy Muris, former chairman of the Federal Trade Commission
 Paul F. Nichols, former delegate to the Virginia General Assembly
 Raymond O'Brien
 Daniel D. Polsby, Dean of Law
 Jeremy A. Rabkin
 Steve Ricchetti, served as White House Deputy Chief of Staff in the Clinton administration; counselor to Vice President Joe Biden
 Chuck Robb, former Governor of Virginia; former U.S. Senator
 Kyndra Miller Rotunda, Army JAG officer
 Hans-Bernd Schäfer
 Loren A. Smith, Federal Judge
 Michael Uhlmann
 Clay T. Whitehead, former director of the White House Office of Telecommunications Policy
 Todd Zywicki, former Director of the Office of Policy Planning at the Federal Trade Commission

School of Recreation, Health, and Tourism
 Steve Baumann, Chief Executive of the National Soccer Hall of Fame
 Charley Casserly, General Manager of the Washington Redskins and Houston Texans
 Craig Esherick, former head coach of the Georgetown basketball team

Notable alumni

Corporate/non-profit
 Muna Abu-Sulayman, Secretary General and Executive Director, Alwaleed Philanthropies
 Erden Eruç, President, CEO, Around-n-Over
 Zainab Salbi, President, Women for Women International
 Will Seippel, executive
 Roy Speckhardt, Executive Director, American Humanist Association
 Martin Andrew Taylor, former Senior Executive Corporate VP of Windows Live and MSN

Government, politics, and economics

 Abdiweli Mohamed Ali, President of Puntland and former Prime Minister of Somalia
 David Bobzien, member of the Nevada Assembly
 Denise Bode, energy expert, member of President George W. Bush's Energy Transition Advisory Team
 Anna E. Cabral, Treasurer of the United States under President George W. Bush
 John Cobin, American-born Chilean economist and politician, former U.S. Libertarian Party candidate, and founder of the Galt’s Gulch Libertarian Compound in Chile. Know for his involvement in the 2019 Reñaca shooting during the 2019–2021 Chilean protests
 Kathleen L. Casey, Commissioner of the U.S. Securities and Exchange Commission
 Sandra Cauffman, NASA
 Sean Connaughton, Virginia Secretary of Transportation and former U.S. Maritime Administrator
 Garrison Courtney, Chief Public Affairs of the Drug Enforcement Administration
 Ken Cuccinelli, Attorney General of Virginia
 Bob Deuell, Texas State Senator
 Christine Fox, former acting U.S. Deputy Secretary of Defense
 Michael Frey, member of the Fairfax County Board of Supervisors
 Nancy Garland, member of the Ohio house of representatives
 Juleanna Glover, press secretary to Vice President Dick Cheney
 Bethany Hall-Long, Lieutenant Governor of Delaware
 William D. Hansen, US Deputy Secretary of Education under President George W. Bush
 Charniele Herring, former Majority Leader Virginia House of Delegates 
 Deborah Hersman, National Transportation Safety Board
 Cathy Hudgins, member of the Fairfax County Board of Supervisors
 David Jolly, member of the United States House of Representatives
 Mohammad Khazaee, Representative of the Islamic Republic of Iran to the UN
 Kaye Kory, Virginia House Delegate
 Sherri Kraham, deputy VP at the Millennium Challenge Corporation
 Nathan Larson, former politician, arrested in Denver, Colorado and faces child kidnapping and child pornography charges
 Mark B. Madsen, Utah State Senator
 Mike Mazzei, Oklahoma State Senator
 William W. Mercer, United States Attorney for the District of Montana
 John Morlu, Liberian presidential candidate
 Liam O'Grady, United States federal judge
 Paul F. Nichols, Virginia House Delegate
 Nancy Pfotenhauer, adviser to the 2008 John McCain presidential campaign
 David Ramadan, member of the Virginia House of Delegates
 Steve Ricchetti, former Deputy Chief of Staff to President Bill Clinton
 Denise Turner Roth, former Administrator of the GSA
 James M. Scott, Virginia House Delegate
 William P. Winfree, NASA
 Richard L. Young, United States federal judge
 Chris Wood, director of the Central Intelligence Agency's Counterterrorism Center
 Harold T. Martin III, National Security Agency contractor convicted of theft of classified information

Literary and media

 Richard Bausch, novelist
 Robert Bausch, novelist
 David Michael Conner, author
 Stuart Cosgrove, Scottish journalist, broadcaster and television executive
 Sharon Creech, novelist
 Chad Ford, sports journalist and founder of ESPN Insider
 Angie Goff, news anchor, NBC 4 Washington WRC-TV
 Hala Gorani, news anchor, CNN International
 Brian Krebs, journalist
 Carolyn Kreiter-Foronda, Poet Laureate of Virginia
 J. Michael Martinez, poet
 Nadine Meyer, poet
 Stephen Moore, journalist, policy analyst, The Wall Street Journal and Fox News
 Evan Oakley, poet
 Nancy K. Pearson, poet
 Susan Rook, news anchor, CNN
 Clayton Swisher, journalist, Al Jazeera English
 Rebecca Wee, poet
 Mark Winegardner, author

Sports and entertainment

 Julius Achon, Ugandan distance runner, 800m American collegiate record holder
 Joe Addo, soccer player
 Mark Adickes, football player
 Murielle Ahouré, NCAA Indoor Track and Field Championships All-American in the 60-meter dash
 Jorge Andres, Anchor & NFL Analyst for NBC Universal, Former Sportscenter Anchor for ESPN
 Negar Assari, artist
 Abdi Bile, Olympic runner
 Justin Bour, baseball player, Miami Marlins
 Brent Brockman, soccer player
 Bill Brown, George Mason baseball coach
 Lamar Butler, basketball player
 Shawn Camp, baseball player, Toronto Blue Jays
 Folarin Campbell, basketball player
 Rebecca Cardon, actress
 Terri Dendy, Olympic track and field athlete
 Jennifer Derevjanik, basketball player
 Ben Dogra, sports agent
 John Driscoll, actor
 Chad Dukes, radio host, WJFK-FM
 Jerry Dunn, basketball coach
 Ryan Ellis, NASCAR driver
 George Evans, basketball player
 Denis Hamlett, soccer coach
 Luke Hancock, former George Mason basketball player; current Louisville basketball player
 Richard Hatch, winner of the first season of Survivor
 Nikki Hornsby, Grammy voting singer, songwriter, musician, recording artist, founder of CJP-NHRecords
 Jake Kalish, baseball player
 King Kamali, Iranian bodybuilder
 Archie Kao, actor
 Joelle Khoury, musician (pianist and composer)
 Sarah Kozer, television personality, appeared on Joe Millionaire
 Jai Lewis, basketball player
 Bob Lilley, soccer player and head coach
 Tamir Linhart, soccer player
 Jason Miskiri, former NBA basketball player for the Charlotte Hornets
 Dayton Moore, general manager, senior VP, Kansas City Royals
 Mike Morrison, basketball player
 Paige Moss, actress
 Rob Muzzio, decathlon champion, Olympic athlete
 Anthony Noreiga, soccer player
 Gabe Norwood, Philippine Basketball Association player
 Ryan Pearson, basketball player
 Richard Phillips, Jamaican sprinter; competed in the 110 metres hurdles at the 2004, 2008, and the 2012 Summer Olympics
 Jennifer Pitts, Miss Virginia, Miss Virginia USA
 Mark Pulisic, soccer player
 Charlie Raphael, soccer player
 Rob Rose, former NBA basketball player for the Los Angeles Clippers
 Dianna Russini, ESPN anchor
 Kenny Sanders, basketball player
 Rhea Seehorn, actress
 Ritch Shydner, comedian
 Tony Skinn, basketball player
 Tommy Steenberg, ice skater
 Shawn Stiffler, college baseball coach at VCU
 Will Thomas, basketball player
 David Verburg, 400m sprinter; won the gold medal in the 2013 World Championship 4 × 400 m relay
 Alan Webb, American record holder in the mile
 Chris Widger, former MLB baseball player
 Aimee Willard, lacrosse player
 Ricky Wilson, former NBA basketball player for the San Antonio Spurs and the New Jersey Nets
 Carlos Yates, basketball player
 Jesse Young, basketball player; member of the Canada national team that participated in the 1999 and 2003 Pan American Games
 Kate Ziegler, world record distance swimmer

Other

 Amir Ansari, venture capitalist
 Anousheh Ansari, space tourist
 Sandy Antunes, astronomer
 Randall C. Berg, Jr., lawyer
 M. Brian Blake, professor
 Mark A. Calabria, Director of Financial Regulation Studies at the Cato Institute
 Alan M. Davis, engineer and businessman
 Chris DiBona, Google Public Sector Director
 Taylor Edgar, stand-up comic and musician
 Sibel Edmonds, former Federal Bureau of Investigation translator
 Fred E. Foldvary, economist
 Graham Foust, professor and poet
 Steven Horwitz, economist
 Raynard Jackson, Republican political consultant
 Matt Kibbe, President and CEO of FreedomWorks
 Jonathan Klick, professor
 Robert A. Levy, Chairman of the Cato Institute
 Jeb Livingood, professor and writer
 Daniel Mann, lawyer
 Gustavo A. Mellander, Ph.D.,D.H.L. Dean Emeritus Graduate School. Member New Jersey State Board of Education.
 George Michael, professor
 Kendrick Moxon, lawyer and Scientologist
 Sareh Nouri, Luxury Bridal Designer
 Angela Orebaugh, cyber security technologist and professor
 Mark Perry, professor
 Brad Pfaff, USDA Wisconsin Farm Service Agency executive director
 David Prychitko, economist
 Jose Rodriguez, political activist
 Stephen Slivinski, economist for the Goldwater Institute
 Victoria Stiles, makeup artist
 Edward Stringham, professor
 Jeffery Taubenberger, virologist
 Deborah Willis, photographer and professor
 Ali al-Tamimi, convicted terrorist

References

George Mason University people